Daniel Estrada Pérez (January 3, 1947, in Cusco - March 23, 2003 in Lima) was a Peruvian lawyer and politician. He served as the Provincial Mayor of Cusco Province, which contains the city of Cusco,  from 1984 to 1986 and again from 1990 until 1995. Estrada was then elected to the Congress of the Republic of Peru, where he served from 1995 to 2003.

1947 births
2003 deaths
Provincial Mayors of Cusco Province
Members of the Congress of the Republic of Peru
People from Cusco
20th-century Peruvian lawyers

Union for Peru politicians